The Battle of Dengbu Island was a conflict between the Republic of China Army and People's Liberation Army over Dengbu Island (in the Zhoushan Islands) near mainland China. This conflict occurred from 3 November 1949 to 5 November 1949 and resulted in a Republic of China victory.

Nevertheless, the ROC was later forced to withdraw when the PRC gained air superiority over the region, leaving Dengbu Island in the control of the PRC.

See also
List of battles of Chinese Civil War
National Revolutionary Army
History of the People's Liberation Army
Chinese Civil War

References

External links
 Another ROCA side's story
 PLA side's story
 ROCA area commander's story

Dengbu Island
Dengbu 1949
1949 in China
Dengbu Island